Josh Binstock (born January 12, 1981), nicknamed Binner, is a male two-time Olympian beach volleyball player from Canada. He competed in the 2012 Olympics in London and the 2016 Summer Olympics in Rio. He also competed for Canada in volleyball in Israel in the 2001 Maccabiah Games, the 2005 Maccabiah Games, the 2009 Maccabiah Games, the 2013 Maccabiah Games (at which he was Canada's flag-bearer, and won a silver medal), and the 2017 Maccabiah Games (at which he won a gold medal). In 2014, he and his partner were Canadian national champions, his third national championship.

Personal life
His parents are Howard and Suzanne, and he has siblings Aaron, Michelle, and Todd.

His hometown is Richmond Hill, Ontario, and he graduated from Richmond Hill High School (Ontario). He attended the University of Toronto, where he received a Bachelor of Health and Physical Education in 2004. He is a trained chiropractor, having earned a Doctorate of Chiropractic at the Canadian Memorial Chiropractic College in 2009.

Volleyball career
Binstock began competing in volleyball when he was 23 years old, on the beach circuit during his off-season from the University of Toronto. He is known for his defensive ability and is able to play the left and right side. He is known to be a good setter and has a very efficient side out game.

He won two straight Canadian National Championships with Matt Zbyszewski, in 2008 and 2009.

In 2014 he and partner Sam Schachter were Canadian national champions, his third national championship, and also won a gold medal at the Paraná Open, an FIVB (international volleyball federation) World Tour event. In 2015 they placed 9th at the FIVB World Championship, and came in second at the Major Series tournament in Porec, Croatia.

Olympics
Binstock competed in the 2012 Summer Olympics in London with his teammate Martin Reader.  He played beach volleyball in the 2016 Summer Olympics in Rio with Sam Schachter.

Maccabiah Games
He competed for Canada in volleyball in the 2001 Maccabiah Games, the 2005 Maccabiah Games, the 2009 Maccabiah Games, and the 2013 Maccabiah Games in Israel, at which he was Canada's flag-bearer and won a silver medal in the indoor competition. At the 2017 Maccabiah Games, he and Aaron Nusbaum went undefeated to win the gold medal in men's beach volleyball.

Sponsors
Binstock is sponsored by Overkill, Canuck Stuff, and Bolle.

References

External links
 
 
 
 
 

1981 births
Living people
Canadian men's beach volleyball players
Beach volleyball players at the 2012 Summer Olympics
Olympic beach volleyball players of Canada
Beach volleyball players at the 2015 Pan American Games
Pan American Games competitors for Canada
Sportspeople from Richmond Hill, Ontario
Volleyball players from Toronto
University of Toronto alumni
Toronto Varsity Blues volleyball players
Beach volleyball players at the 2016 Summer Olympics
Jewish Canadian sportspeople
Maccabiah Games competitors by sport
Maccabiah Games gold medalists for Canada
Maccabiah Games silver medalists for Canada
Maccabiah Games medalists
Competitors at the 2001 Maccabiah Games
Competitors at the 2005 Maccabiah Games
Competitors at the 2009 Maccabiah Games
Competitors at the 2013 Maccabiah Games
Competitors at the 2017 Maccabiah Games
Canadian Memorial Chiropractic College alumni